Robert Redding may refer to:

Rob Redding (born 1976), American journalist and commentator
Jheri Redding (born Robert William Redding; 1907–1998), American hairdresser

See also
Robert Reddinge, English friar
Robert Reading (c. 1640-c. 1689), Irish politician